The Waterloo Women's Open Invitational was a golf tournament on the LPGA Tour from 1958 to 1966. It was played at the Sunnyside Country Club in Waterloo, Iowa.

Winners
1966 Carol Mann
1965 Betsy Rawls
1964 Shirley Englehorn
1963 Mickey Wright
1962 Marilynn Smith
1961 Mickey Wright
1960 Wiffi Smith
1959 Betsy Rawls
1958 Fay Crocker

See also
Waterloo Open - a men's event

References

Former LPGA Tour events
Golf in Iowa
Recurring sporting events established in 1958
Recurring sporting events disestablished in 1966
1958 establishments in Iowa
1966 disestablishments in Iowa
Women in Iowa